Shijie is a town under the jurisdiction of Dongguan prefecture-level city in Guangdong province, China, located to the north/northeast of downtown.

External links

Geography of Dongguan
Towns in Guangdong